Armavir is a city in Krasnodar Krai, Russia, located on the left bank of the Kuban River. Population:  As of 2020, the city has a population of 188,960, while the agglomeration has a population of 207,570. Armavir was formerly the second-largest industrial center of Krasnodar Krai, after Krasnodar.

History
The area of today's Armavir was first inhabited by Abazins. Later Turkic Tatars from the Crimean Khanate also settled here. As a result of the Caucasian War the remaining Abazins were forced to emigrate from Southern Russia to the Ottoman Empire. Armavir is also a part of the historical land of the Circassians.

The contemporary settlement was founded in 1839 by Cherkesogai Armenians  as Armyansky aul. It has been known by its current name since 1848, when it was named after the Armavir, one of the historical capitals of ancient Armenia. The city was the administrative center of the Labinsky Otdel of the Kuban Oblast.

During the Russian Civil War of 1918–1920, a number of brutal battles took place near the city. The Taman Army's military campaign ended in Armavir in 1918. The Soviet authority was established in Armavir in March 1920. During World War II, the city was occupied by the German Army. It was liberated by the Red Army in January 1943.

Administrative and municipal status
Within the framework of administrative divisions, it is, together with eleven rural localities, incorporated as the City of Armavir—an administrative unit with the status equal to that of the districts. As a municipal division, the City of Armavir is incorporated as Armavir Urban Okrug.

Industry 
Armavir is the second largest industrial center of Krasnodar Krai, after Krasnodar. The city is known as center for food processing, machine building and timber working industries. Here is located one of the oldest engineering enterprises of Kuban - Kubanzheldormash, founded in 1933.

Climate
Armavir has a humid continental climate.

Military
Armavir (air base) is close to the city.

Twin towns – sister cities

Armavir is twinned with:
 Armavir, Armenia
 Feodosia, Ukraine
 Gomel, Belarus

References

Notes

Sources

External links
Official website of Armavir 
Unofficial website of Armavir 
Directory of organizations in Armavir 

Cities and towns in Krasnodar Krai
Armavir Urban Okrug
Kuban Oblast
Populated places established in 1839
1839 establishments in the Russian Empire